Vitis bellula, commonly known as the beautiful grape or small leaf hair grape, is a Chinese liana (woody vine) in the grape family. It is native to the provinces of Guangdong, Guangxi, Hubei, Hunan, and Sichuan.

External links
Plants of the World Online: Vitis bellula
Flora of China: Vitis bellula
International Plant Names Index: Vitis bellula
Global Biodiversity Information Facility: Vitis bellula
Vitis bellula (Beautiful Grape)

Gallery

References

bellula
Endemic flora of China
Plants described in 1979